Said, also spelled Saeid, Said, Saïd, Sid, Saeed, Sayeed or Sayid, is a male Arabic given name which means "blessed (in Quranic Classical Arabic), good luck, joy" or "happy, patient". The name stems from the Arabic verb sa‘ada (سَعَدَ - 'to be happy, fortunate or lucky').

The lesser uncommon form of the name Said is "Suid (سُعِيد suīd)" and the feminine form of the name is Saida (Saidah, سَعِيدة saīdah) or Suida (Suidah, سُعِيدة suīdah). Said is another variant from the Arabic given name Saad.

The written form of the name in Turkish is Sait and in Bosnian is Seid. Said or Sid is the spelling used in most Latin languages.

The Maltese surname Saïd has the same origin but has been borne by Latin Catholics for over seven centuries. Most Maltese surnames are of Italian origin, but this (with Abdilla) is one of the very few authentically Arabic given names that have survived in the islands as family names. It is a variant of the medieval Sicilian Christian surname Saido or Saito (Saidu), which was derived from the Siculo-Arabic given name Sa'īd used by both Muslims and Christians. In Sicily and Malta, this surname was sometimes Italianized as (De) Felice. The surname was established in Malta by 1419, appearing mostly as Sayd in the militia list of that year. In the 1480 militia list it is spelt mostly Said, but was later variously written Said, Sayd, Sajt, Sait in the Catholic church census of 1687. The anachronistic and undocumented claim that 'Nicolò Sayd', a grandson of Cem (1459–1496, the renegade son of Turkish Sultan Mehmet II) settled in Malta and became the ancestor of all Maltese bearing the surname Said is a fantasy inspired by the writings of historical novelists Maurice Caron and John Freely and recently promoted by amateur genealogists.

Today, francophone countries use transliterations of that name. These include the names Seydoux and Seydou, which are common in Europe and West Africa, respectively.

Given name
Sa'id of Egypt (or Sa'id Pasha, 1822–1863), Ottoman Viceroy and Egyptian ruler for whom Port Said is named
Saeed Ajmal, Pakistani cricketer
Saeid Alihosseini (born 1988), Iranian weightlifter
Said Salim Bakhresa, a Tanzanian businessman
Said Bahaji, German al-Qaeda member
Saeid Bayat (born 1976), Iranian football midfielder
Saeed Blacknall (born 1996), American football player
Saïd Bouteflika (born 1958), Algerian politician and brother of former Algerian President Abdelaziz Bouteflika
Saeid Davarpanah (born 1987), Iranian professional basketball player
Saeid Ebrahimi (born 1982), Iranian wrestler
Saeed al-Ghamdi, Saudi Arabian hijacker of United Airlines Flight 93 in the September 11 attacks
Said al-Ghazzi (1893–1967), Syrian lawyer and politician 
Saeed Hanaei, Iranian serial killer
Sa'id Hormozi, Iranian musician
Sa'id ibn Jubayr (665–714), one of the leading Tabi‘un
Sultan Said Khan, ruler of Kashgaria in 1514–1533
Saeid Marouf (born 1985), a volleyball player from Iran
Saeed al-Masri, Egyptian al-Qaeda member
Saeed Akhtar Mirza (born 1943), Indian film director
Said Musa, Belizean politician
Saeed Nafisi, Iranian scholar
Saeed Naqvi, Indian journalist
Said Nursî (1878–1960), Muslim Scholar from Turkey
Saeid Pirdoost, Iranian actor
Said Sheikh Samatar, Somali historian
Said Mohammad Sammour (born 1950), Syrian politician
Said Shavershian (born 1986), Australian bodybuilder
Said Ali al-Shihri, Saudi Arabian al-Qaeda member
Said bin Sultan (1797–1856), Sultan of Muscat and Oman
Saïd Taghmaoui (born 1973), French actor
Said bin Taimur (1910–1972), previous Sultan of Oman
Sa'id ibn Uthman (died 680), one of the Tabi‘un and son of Uthman
Saeed Abubakr Zakaria, 21st-century Ghanaian scholar and leading member of Ahlus Sunnah Wal Jamaa'a
Sa'id bin Zayd (593–673), one of the companions of Muhammed

Middle name
Mehmed Said Pasha (or Said Pasha, 1830–1914), Ottoman Grand Vizier

Abu Sa‘id
Abu Sa'id (Ilkhanid dynasty) (1316–1335), ninth ruler of the Ilkhanate state in Iran
Abu Sa'id (Timurid dynasty) (1424–1469), mid-fifteenth century Timurid Empire ruler in what are today parts of Persia and Afghanistan
Abu Said Faraj, a Nasrid prince of Granada, d. 1320
Abu Sa‘id al-Khudri
Abū-Sa'īd Abul-Khayr (967–1049), Persian Sufi and poet
Khaled al-Hassan (1928–1994), known as Abu Said, Palestine Liberation Organization leader
Abu Saeed Muhammad Omar Ali (1919–2012), Bangladeshi Islamic scholar and translator

Surname
Abdelmadjid Sidi Said, leader of the Algerian trade union UGTA
Abdulla Saeed (born 1964), chief justice of the Maldives
Ali Said Raygal, Somali politician
Amina Said (born 1953), poet
Anjum Saeed (born 1968), Pakistani field hockey player
Anne Said (1914–1995), English artist 
Boris Said (born 1962), American race car driver
Brian Said (born 1973), Maltese footballer
Edward Said (1935–2003), Palestinian-American literary critic and theorist
Hakim Said (1920–1998), Pakistani physician and scholar
Hilda Saeed (born 1936), Pakistani activist and journalist
Hussein Saeed, Iraqi footballer
Kurban Said, pseudonym for the author of the novel Ali and Nino
Mizanur Rahman Sayed (born 1963), Bangladeshi Islamic scholar
Nasser Al Saeed (1923–unknown), Saudi Arabian writer 
Samira Said (born 1961), Moroccan pop star
Wafic Saïd (born 1939), Syrian businessman
Yaser Abdel Said, FBI Top 10 Most Wanted fugitive
Qaboos bin Said Al Said, previous Sultan of Oman
 Harun Said or Harun Thohir, birth name Tahir bin Mandir, was an Indonesian soldier and terrorist who carried out the MacDonald House bombing on 10 March 1965. He was executed in 1968 alongside his comrade and accomplice Usman bin Haji Muhammad Ali for the murders of three people as resulted from the bombing.

Fictional characters
Sayid Jarrah, character on the television series Lost
Kareem Saïd, character on the HBO drama Oz 
Said Rachid, character on the television series O Clone, interpreted by Dalton Vigh.
Mustafa Sa'eed, protagonist of the novel Season of Migration to the North

Other uses
aṣ-Ṣaʿīd (spelled with a Ṣād, صعيد) is the Arabic term for Upper Egypt. The personal name is related to a different root, whose first letter is Sīn.
Sa'idi people refers to the inhabitants of Upper Egypt. 
Saïd Business School at Oxford University, name after Wafic Saïd

See also
Bensaïd
Essaïd
Seydou
Seydoux
Sheikh Said (disambiguation)
Syed, similar name with different pronunciation
Suat

Arabic-language surnames
Arabic masculine given names
Iranian masculine given names